Andrea Martinez is a Spanish beauty queen and national titleholder. She was crowned as Miss Universe Spain 2020 (Nuestra Belleza España 2020).

Awards

Nuestra Belleza Espana 2020 (Winner)

Miss Universe 2020 (Unplaced)

Preceded by:                                                                                                         Succeeded by 
Natalie Ortega                                                                     Andrea Martinez                                    Sarah Loinaz

Be Miss Universe Spain 2019                                                                                 Nuestra Belleza Espana 2021

(Last woman from Spain with the former title)

References

Spanish beauty pageant winners
Living people
Year of birth missing (living people)